Xystoscolex is a genus of palaeoscolecidian worm known from the Sirius Passet, North Greenland.

References

Prehistoric protostome genera
Sirius Passet fossils
Paleoscolecids